Natacha Gachnang (born 27 October 1987 in Vevey, Switzerland) is a Swiss race driver and the cousin of former Formula One driver Sébastien Buemi. In 2010 she was a member of the first all-female crew to race at Le Mans 24 hours since 1991, and she competed at Le Mans again in 2013.

Career
2001 Swiss junior karting champion.
2002 Formula BMW ADAC Meisterschaft test – fourth of 64 drivers.
2003 Formula BMW ADAC Meisterschaft – one fourth-place finish.
2004 Formula BMW ADAC Meisterschaft – two fourth-place finishes.
2005 Formula BMW ADAC Meisterschaft – sixth, three podiums.
2006 Formula 3 Cup – one podium, nine top-10 finishes.
2007 Star Mazda 3- two podiums.
2007/2008 A1 Grand Prix - Rookie driver for Switzerland (Brno)

On 17 December 2008, it was announced she would be the first female to drive in the new Formula One feeder series FIA Formula Two Championship. She finished 23rd in the campaign, scoring two points.

2008 Spanish Formula 3 - four podiums.
2009 Formula 2 - one top-10 finish.

For the 2010 season she teamed up with Cyndie Allemann and raced for the Swiss Matech team in a GT1 class Ford GT in the FIA GT1 World Championship.  During qualifying for the first round of the championship in Abu Dhabi, she crashed heavily, breaking her right tibia.

She returned to racing in the 24 Hours of Le Mans, with Gachnang and Allemann being joined by fellow Swiss Rahel Frey. This marked the first time since 1991, with Lyn St. James, Desire Wilson and Cathy Muller, that an all-female team competed at Le Mans.

Racing record

Career summary

Complete Formula 3 Euro Series results
(key)

Complete FIA Formula Two Championship results
(key) (Races in bold indicate pole position) (Races in italics indicate fastest lap)

Complete Auto GP Results
(key)

Complete GT1 World Championship results

Complete 24 Hours of Le Mans results

References

External links

Official website
Campos Grandprix website
Official Spanish Formula 3 website
Photos by driver: Natacha Gachnang  at Motorsport.com
Natcha Gachnang career statistics at Driver Database
Formula 2 Series' Natacha Gachnang at Jalopnik

Swiss racing drivers
1987 births
Living people
Swiss female racing drivers
Euroformula Open Championship drivers
A1 Grand Prix Rookie drivers
Atlantic Championship drivers
FIA Formula Two Championship drivers
Indy Pro 2000 Championship drivers
Formula BMW ADAC drivers
FIA GT1 World Championship drivers
European Le Mans Series drivers
24 Hours of Le Mans drivers
FIA World Endurance Championship drivers
People from Vevey
Sportspeople from the canton of Vaud
Jo Zeller Racing drivers
Campos Racing drivers
Charouz Racing System drivers
Josef Kaufmann Racing drivers
Morand Racing drivers